Alicja (Alice) Kozłowska (born in 2000.) is a contemporary Polish mixed media and textile artist.

She works mainly with felt, creating three-dimensional embroidered felt sculptures of everyday objects drawing inspiration from the reality that surrounds her and consumerism. Alice's work is deeply influenced by Andy Warhol and Pop art. She is trying to popularize Fiber Art and embroidery as a modern art medium.

Her work is exhibited in galleries and museums across Europe and United States, among others in: The LAM museum, Danubiana Meulensteen Art Museum, Pesti Vigadó gallery, the Virtual Shoe Museum, The Valtopina Embroidery and Textile Museum, Bargehouse/ OXO Tower Wharf, Palazzo Velli Expo.

References

External links 
 Official website
 Official Instagram

21st-century Polish artists
Textile artists
Polish women artists
Polish contemporary artists
Mixed-media artists
Embroiderers
Living people
2000 births
21st-century Polish women artists